Crémas also spelled Crémasse, is a sweet and creamy alcoholic beverage native to Haiti. The beverage is made primarily from creamed coconut, sweetened condensed milk, evaporated milk, cinnamon, clove, nutmeg, vanilla essence, almond essence, lime, and Haitian rhum.

See also
Rhum agricole
Haitian cuisine
Coquito, a similar drink  from Puerto Rico

References

Haitian alcoholic drinks
Mixed drinks
Cocktails with rum
Three-ingredient cocktails
Creamy cocktails
Cocktails with coconut
Sweet cocktails
Cocktails with milk
Tiki drinks
Cocktails with dark rum